Trunk 2 is part of the Canadian province of Nova Scotia's system of Trunk Highways. The route runs from Halifax to Fort Lawrence on the New Brunswick border. Until the 1960s, Trunk 2 was the Halifax area's most important highway link to other provinces, and was part of a longer Interprovincial Highway 2 which ended in Windsor, Ontario. The controlled access Highway 102 and Highway 104 now carry most arterial traffic in the area, while Trunk 2 serves regional and local traffic.

This highway forms part of the Glooscap Trail signed tourist route.

Route description

Trunk 2 begins at intersection of Connaught Avenue and Bayers Road on the Halifax Peninsula in the Halifax Regional Municipality, and travels north along Connaught Avenue and Windsor Street to Lady Hammond Road. This short section has minimal Trunk 2 signage, instead being signed as the main connection between Highway 102 and Highway 111. At the intersection of Lady Hammond Road and Windsor Street, route heads north, following the Bedford Highway, which runs along the western shore of the Bedford Basin, to the former town of Bedford.

At the north end of Bedford, Trunk 2 takes the Rocky Lake Drive northeast to Waverley where it then turns north (as a continuation of the Waverley Road) along the eastern shore of Lake Thomas.  It passes through Fall River and continues along the eastern shore of Fletchers Lake as it passes through Fletchers Lake.  It continues along the eastern shore of Shubenacadie Grand Lake and passes through Wellington Station, Wellington, Grand Lake Station and Oakfield before turning slightly northeast to enter the Shubenacadie Valley.

It enters Hants County at Enfield where it crosses to the west bank of the Shubenacadie River. The highway follows the west side of the Shubenacadie Valley through Elmsdale, Lantz and Milford Station to the village of Shubenacadie where it crosses to the east bank of the Shubenacadie River and enters Colchester County. It climbs out of the Shubenacadie Valley and passes by the town of Stewiacke and the rural community of Brookfield, the suburb of Hilden and the Millbrook First Nation before entering the town of Truro.

In Truro, Trunk 2 follows Willow Street and then Prince Street West (co-signed for Trunk 4), then Juniper Street and Robie Street to the interchange with Highway 102 in Lower Truro.  Trunk 2/4 follows Highway 102 for 1 kilometre to the north, crossing the Salmon River between exits 14 and 14A to Onslow and then continues as a local road heading west from Onslow along the north shore of Cobequid Bay through Masstown and Glenholme, where Trunk 2 and 4 separate.

From Glenholme, Trunk 2 continues west along the north shore of the Minas Basin through Great Village, Bass River, Economy, and Five Islands forming parts of the Glooscap Trail and Fundy Shore Ecotour.  At the town of Parrsboro, Trunk 2 turns north through the Cobequid Hills to Newville Lake before turning northeast to reach the Southampton River, which Trunk 2 follows to the town of Springhill. Trunk 2 turns northwest from Springhill and runs a further 30 km to the town of Amherst which it passes through until it reaches the rural community of Fort Lawrence on the interprovincial boundary with New Brunswick.

History 
The section of Trunk 2 between Springhill and Little Forks was once Trunk 26 prior to 1938. Trunk 26 then turns left on Little Forks Rd and ends in Athol. At this time, Trunk 2 took a more westerly route, running through Athol and Nappan. This old alignment of Trunk 2 is currently Collector Highway 302.

Before the 1960s, Trunk 4 was co-signed with Trunk 2 from Amherst to Springhill.

Major intersections

References  

002
002
002
002
002
Amherst, Nova Scotia
Truro, Nova Scotia